Trị An is a hydroelectric dam and lake on the Đồng Nai River in Vĩnh Cửu, Đồng Nai, Vietnam.  The power plant has an installed electric capacity of 400 MW and producing around 1.76 TWh of electricity per year.  The plant is operated by Trị An Hydropower Company, a subsidiary of Vietnam Electricity.

The dam was built in 1984–1986 with the assistance of the Soviet Union.  The power plant became operational in 1988. The dam forms a man-made reservoir lake known as Trị An Lake.  La Ngà village on the La Ngà River was created as a result of population displacement.

The dam appears on the 5000 Vietnamese đồng note released in 1993.

References

Hydroelectric power stations in Vietnam
Dams in Vietnam
Energy infrastructure completed in 1988
Buildings and structures in Đồng Nai province
Soviet foreign aid
Soviet Union–Vietnam relations